Bellcaire may refer to:

Bellcaire d'Empordà
Bellcaire d'Urgell